was a Japanese political figure of the mid to late 20th century. The grandson of Tokugawa Yoshikatsu, the last lord of Owari han, he served as Grand Chamberlain of Japan from 1985 to 1988, serving as the Emperor of Japan's personal adviser. Yoshihiro was famous for saving the recording of Emperor Hirohito's surrender address from destruction by army officials who wished to continue the war during the Kyūjō Incident.

References 

1906 births
1996 deaths
Japanese politicians
Kazoku
University of Tokyo alumni
Owari Tokugawa family